Mill Creek is a  long second-order tributary to Marshyhope Creek in Dorchester County, Maryland.

Course

Watershed
Mill Creek drains  of area, receives about 44.2 in/year of precipitation and is about 9.98% forested.

See also
List of Maryland rivers

References

Rivers of Maryland
Rivers of Dorchester County, Maryland
Tributaries of the Nanticoke River